The following is a list of presidents of the municipality of Tijuana in Baja California.

See also
 Tijuana history and timeline
 First Lady of Tijuana

 
Lists of mayors
Tijuana